The Central District of Qaleh Ganj County is a district (bakhsh) in Qaleh Ganj County, Kerman Province, Iran. At the 2006 census, its population was 45,367, in 9,538 families.  The district has one city: Qaleh Ganj. The district has two rural districts (dehestan): Qaleh Ganj Rural District and Sorkh Qaleh Rural District.

References 

Qaleh Ganj County
Districts of Kerman Province